Stewart is a small unincorporated community in Jordan Township, Warren County, in the U.S. state of Indiana.  It sits at the south end of the short Bee Line Railroad and consists of a single residence and a grain elevator operated by the Stewart Grain Company.  The original elevator, built in 1905 and rebuilt in 1910 after a fire, still stands although it was moved 500 feet to a non-working location in 2009 for historical and sentimental reasons.

Geography
Stewart is located at the intersection of County Road 300 North and the Bee Line Railroad, about two miles directly east of Pence.

References

Warren County Historical Society. A History of Warren County, Indiana (175th Anniversary Edition) (2002).

External links
 Stewart Grain Company

Unincorporated communities in Indiana
Unincorporated communities in Warren County, Indiana